Emma Richardson Cherry (February 28, 1859 – October 29, 1954) was an American painter of landscapes, still lifes and portraits.

Early life
Emma Richardson was born in Aurora, Illinois on February 28, 1859 to James Perkins and Frances Ann (Mostow) Richardson.

Career
Richardson was a co-founder of the Kansas City Art Association and School of Design, after moving to the city and establishing an art studio in 1885. She was living in Nebraska when she met Dillon Brook Cherry, whom she married. In 1888, she began a two-year tour of Europe in order to study art. She was a student of Académie Julian and Académie Delécluse in Paris, also of Luc-Olivier Merson, and of the Art Students League of New York. She was a member of the Denver Art Club as well as the Western Art Association, from which she received a gold medal in 1891.

By the 1890s, Cherry and her husband relocated to Houston, where she found the former downtown home of ex-Houston-mogul, William Marsh Rice. She acquired the house and moved it to Fargo Street in the Montrose area. She was an organizer of the Houston Art League, which was founded in 1900, and later formed the basis for Houston's first art museum.

In 1903, Cherry was painting in Chicago and its vicinity. Among her sitters were Orrington Lunt, the donor of the Library of the Northwestern University, and Bishop Foster, a former president of the same university. She also completed a portrait of a former president of the American Society of Civil Engineers, Mr. O. Chanute. An exhibition of ten portraits by this artist was held in Chicago in 1903 and was favorably noticed.

Richardson was one of the founders of the Houston Museum of Fine Arts.

Death and legacy
Cherry died on October 29, 1954. She was commissioned to paint large wall murals at the Julia Ideson Library in Houston, and these works are still extant in 2020. Her house on Fargo Street was later moved to Sam Houston Park in downtown Houston, the first historic structure to relocate to that park. As of 2020, it is available for tours, where some of Cherry's art work is on display.

References
 

1859 births
People from Aurora, Illinois
American portrait painters
American women painters
1954 deaths
Painters from Illinois
19th-century American painters
19th-century American women artists
20th-century American painters
20th-century American women artists
Académie Julian alumni
Art Students League of New York alumni
Artists from Houston
Painters from Texas
Académie Delécluse alumni